Mirzapur is a village of Kharar, tehsil near Kurali Mohali district, Punjab, India. It is located on the North of Chandigarh, adjacent to Mullanpur- Garibdas.

Gallery

References

Mohali
Villages in Sahibzada Ajit Singh Nagar district
Former capital cities in India